Martin Trocha (born 24 December 1957) is a former German footballer.

Club career 
Trocha scored 26 goals in 175 East German top-flight appearances.

International career 
He appeared eight times for East Germany between 1980 and 1982.

References

External links
 
 
 
 FC Carl Zeiss Jena profile

1957 births
Living people
German people of Polish descent
German footballers
East German footballers
East Germany international footballers
Association football forwards
FC Carl Zeiss Jena players
FSV Zwickau players
Hallescher FC players
Szombierki Bytom players
20th-century German people